Chak Sar (also Romanized as Chāk Sar) is a village in Sharq va Gharb-e Shirgah Rural District, North Savadkuh County, Mazandaran Province, Iran. At the 2016 census, its population was 273, in 100 families.

References 

Populated places in Savadkuh County